Trupanea proavita is a species of tephritid or fruit flies in the genus Trupanea of the family Tephritidae.

Distribution
India.

References

Tephritinae
Insects described in 1939
Diptera of Asia